The 1921 European Rowing Championships were rowing championships held on the Amstel in the Dutch capital city Amsterdam from 9 to 11 September. The competition was for men only and they competed in five boat classes (M1x, M2x, M2+, M4+, M8+), the same ones as had been used at the 1920 Summer Olympics in Antwerp.

Medal summary

References

European Rowing Championships
Rowing competitions in the Netherlands
Rowing
Sports competitions in Amsterdam
European Rowing Championships
Rowing
European Rowing Championships